Ağcüyür (also, Agdzhuvur and Agzhur) is a village and the least populous municipality in the Imishli Rayon of Azerbaijan.  It has a population of 382.

References 

Populated places in Imishli District